

The list
Here is a list of the award winners and the films for which they won.

See also

 Tamil cinema
 Cinema of India

References

Villain